Bílčice is a municipality and village in Bruntál District in the Moravian-Silesian Region of the Czech Republic. It has about 200 inhabitants.

Administrative parts
The village of Májůvka is an administrative part of Bílčice.

Gallery

References

External links

Villages in Bruntál District